Princess Adile Zogu (1890–1966) was an Albanian princess. She was the eldest sister of Zog I of Albania.

Birth
Like all of Zog I's sisters, there is a degree of confusion regarding Adile's date of birth. Over the duration of the Zogist monarchy, Zog's three youngest sisters, Myzejen, Ruhije and Maxhide (all of them unmarried) became very coy about their ages. As they grew older, their 'official' dates of birth were advanced forwards, and those of Adile and Nafije were similarly adjusted to prevent a suspicious age-gap. The death of their father, Xhemal Pasha Zogu, was advanced forward at around the same time. Adile was eventually said to have been born in 1894, though 1890–91 is a more likely date. Her gravestone bears the date 1890.

Marriage and later life
Adile (Adila) was married in 1909 to Major Emin Bey Agolli Doshishti (1890–1988). He hailed from a prominent family which owned substantial properties near Lake Ohrid (his parents were Albanian aristocrats Salih Agolli Doshishti and wife Gylijé Allaj). The marriage had probably been arranged years in advance by her mother. The couple had five children. Adile ran the household where she and her sisters (together with the Queen Mother prior to 1934) lived, as the younger princesses had little knowledge of domestic management. She was absent for long periods during the early days of the Albanian Kingdom after she and her youngest daughter Danush contracted tuberculosis. They spent several years at a sanitarium in Switzerland before eventually recovering and returning to Albania.

After the overthrow of the monarchy in the 1939 Italian invasion of Albania, Adile accompanied Zog to England. After his departure to Egypt, she stayed behind and settled in Henley-on-Thames with her two daughters (who were English-educated) and her sister-in-law, Princess Ruhije Xhelal Zogolli (1881–1956). In the late 1950s, she rejoined her surviving siblings in France. After Zog's death in 1961, she lived in Paris with her eldest son, Salih, until her own death in 1966.

Issue

Honours
  Dame Grand Cross of the Order of Fidelity (Kingdom of Albania).

Ancestry

References

1890 births
1966 deaths
Albanian royalty
20th-century Albanian women
People from Mat (municipality)
People from Scutari vilayet
House of Zogu
Albanian expatriates in France